Masjid Mantingan (or Mantingan Mosque) is one of the oldest mosques in Indonesia, located in the center town of Jepara, Central Java Indonesia. The mosque is believed to have been built by Sunan Hadlirin in the era of Kalinyamat Kingdom in 1559 CE, based on a chronogram that was once located at the top of the prayer niche (mihrab).

References

Tourism in Jepara
Mosques in Indonesia
Religious buildings and structures in Central Java